PU-Sarruma (PU-LUGAL-ma, mPU-Šàr-(rù)-ma, possibly representing Hišmi-Šarruma) is a conjectured pre-Empire king of the Hittites. The conjecture was forwarded by Emil Forrer and is not commonly accepted.

He would have reigned around 1600 BC (short chronology).

Family 
Hišmi-Šarruma would correspond to the grandfather of Hattusili I and the father-in-law of Labarna I and true father of Papahdilmah, mentioned (but not by name) by Hattusili. Hišmi-Šarruma was also a father of Tawannanna.

Virtually nothing is known of PU-Šarruma's life, who is a very shadowy figure. PU-Šarruma's sons had turned against their father, so that, while he was in the city of Šanahwitta, he named his son-in-law Labarna as his successor. However, Papahdilmah still had support among the king's servants and chief officers.

See also

 History of the Hittites

Sources

External links
Reign of PU-Sarruma

Hittite kings
17th-century BC rulers